Sascha Amstätter (born 8 November 1977 in Frankfurt am Main) is a German footballer who plays for SV Zeilsheim II.

Career
He made his debut on the professional league level in the 2. Bundesliga for Eintracht Frankfurt on 25 July 1997 when he came on as a substitute in the 68th minute in a game against Fortuna Düsseldorf.

References

1977 births
Living people
German footballers
FSV Frankfurt players
Eintracht Frankfurt players
Eintracht Frankfurt II players
KFC Uerdingen 05 players
SV Darmstadt 98 players
SV Viktoria Preußen 07 players
SV Wehen Wiesbaden players
Bundesliga players
2. Bundesliga players
3. Liga players
Association football midfielders
Footballers from Frankfurt